The Bournemouth East by election was a by election for the Parliament of the United Kingdom held on Thursday, 24 November 1977 after the resignation of John Cordle following his criticism by a Select committee for business links to corrupt architect John Poulson.

Cordle had been elected at the October 1974 general election for the Conservative Party with a majority of 10,661 votes over the Liberal Party.

Results

Outcome
David Atkinson served in the House of Commons until he stood down at the 2005 general election. He was succeeded by retired Army Major Tobias Ellwood, also from the Conservative Party.

References

Bournemouth East by-election
By-elections to the Parliament of the United Kingdom in Dorset constituencies
Bournemouth East by-election
Bournemouth East by-election
History of Bournemouth
Politics of Bournemouth
20th century in Dorset